Providence Canyon State Outdoor Recreation Area is a  Georgia state park located in Stewart County in southwest Georgia, United States. The park contains Providence Canyon, which is sometimes called Georgia's "Little Grand Canyon". It is considered one of the Seven Natural Wonders of Georgia. It is also home to the very rare plumleaf azalea.

One of the quirkier attractions of the state park is an abandoned homestead including nearly a dozen rusty, 1950s-era cars and trucks. Due to the environmental damage that removing the vehicles would cause, park officials have decided to leave them alone.

Canyon formation
Providence Canyon is not actually a purely natural feature: many of the massive gullies — the deepest of which is more than  — are the result of erosion due to poor farming practices in the 19th century.

This story of the origin of the canyons has been commonplace since the 1940s, but the formations in the canyons are at least partially natural. Although there were probably a few early arrivals before 1825, the first heavy influx of settlers in Stewart County only came after the Treaty of Indian Springs (1825), by which the Creek Indians were forced to cede all their lands east of the Chattahoochee River. Evidence of the existence of the canyons at this time includes their mention in a deed by James S. Lunsford to William Tatam from 1836.

Geology
The park lies on marine sediments, usually loamy or clayey, with small areas of sand. Loamy sand topsoils overlie subsoils of sandy clay loam, sandy clay, or clay in most of the uneroded sections. Nankin, Cowarts, Mobila, and Orangeburg are the most prominent soil series. The canyons have significant exposure to clay, over which water often seeps. Water is mobile in this well-drained area.

Facilities
 
 2 picnic shelters
 6 back country campsites
 3 pioneer campsites

Yearly events
 Christmas Workshop (December)
 Astronomy Night (September)
 Fall Wildflower Day (October)
 Geology Day (October)

Images

See also
Red Bluff, Mississippi

References

Further reading

 
 
 
 
 
 
 
 

Canyons and gorges of Georgia (U.S. state)
State parks of Georgia (U.S. state)
Seven Natural Wonders of Georgia (U.S. state)
Protected areas of Stewart County, Georgia
Landforms of Stewart County, Georgia